Gilberto Arnulfo Baires Hernández (born April 1, 1990) is a Salvadoran professional soccer player who currently plays as a midfielder.

Club career
Baires came through the youth ranks at Atlético Marte, and made his professional debut in 2007.

International career
Baires made his debut for El Salvador in a January 2011 UNCAF Nations Cup match against Belize and has, as of January 2012, earned a total of 9 caps, scoring no goals. He has represented his country at the 2011 UNCAF Nations Cup, as well as at the 2011 CONCACAF Gold Cup.

International goals
Scores and results list El Salvador's goal tally first.

References

1990 births
Living people
People from La Paz Department (El Salvador)
Association football midfielders
Salvadoran footballers
El Salvador international footballers
2011 Copa Centroamericana players
2011 CONCACAF Gold Cup players
C.D. Atlético Marte footballers
C.D. Águila footballers
Santa Tecla F.C. footballers
2009 CONCACAF U-20 Championship players